The Old Ones (sometimes referred to in Palladium Books publications as the Great Old Ones or the Unnameable Beings) are a race of Alien Intelligences within the megaversal setting of Palladium Books' game module PFRPG. The Old Ones are the most powerful forces ever to have existed in the various Palladium game settings, and their power dwarfs that of 'ordinary' Alien Intelligences, beings which are in general far more powerful than the gods themselves.

The Old Ones' creator, Kevin Siembieda, named them so as an homage to the fictional characters of the same name by H. P. Lovecraft.

Despite their origins in Palladium Fantasy—the first and oldest of Palladium Books' Game Settings—they are hated and feared throughout the different dimensions of the Palladium Megaverse by those beings who remember them, even those beings who have great power and are evil themselves.

"Society" and achievements
The Old Ones' physical and mental natures were such that to pass the time (and to feed themselves), they each seized upon a specific aspect of pain and suffering to study, psychically feeding on the emotions and suffering that would follow. For example, Ya-blik was the symbol of pestilence, betrayal, and pain, and would spread pestilence and foment those dark emotions where they did not already exist. Netosa was another of the Old Ones; its "portfolio" was that of darkness and death, and it kept sentient beings in never-ending, unreasoning fear of same to drink up the emotions that such terror generated. And Xy, greatest amongst their number, was the Great Old One of Power Incarnate, and fed upon the chaos and suffering brought by the other Old Ones as they conquered planets, galaxies, and entire dimensions in his name.

These creatures, whose origins are unknown (and who may have, in fact, always existed), were the first beings to discover the megaversal energy source known as Potential Psychic Energy (PPE), and develop the "science" of magic to manipulate it.

They are responsible for the creation of such magic 'schools' such as Diabolism (the use of symbols to create temporary, semi-permanent, and permanent magical effects such as spell wards), Invocations (spells performed by words and gestures on the part of a mage or shaman), Rituals (advanced and more powerful magics involving a protracted series of actions and/or sacrifices on the part of one or more mages and/or shamans), Shifting (the summoning of creatures from other locales, worlds, or dimensions for the purpose of doing the summoner's bidding), and were the creators of the first Rune Artifacts (specially designed, indestructible weapons and artifacts created by the mystical merging of a weapon with the life forces of sentient beings).

Rebellion
At the end of a titanic battle some 50,000 years ago in the Palladium Dimension (and an undefined, but likely even greater longer period of time in the past relative to the other Game Settings, due to the differing ages and origins of the respective universes that make up the Palladium Megaverse), the Old Ones were finally defeated by the combined efforts of hundreds of races consisting of billions of sentient beings across the Megaverse; one of the most critical factors in the defeat of the Old Ones was a powerful magic spell by a "former" Old One himself (who was by that time amnesiac, a primary member of the Forces of Light, and entirely unaware of his own origins and true nature). The aftermath of that battle saw many of those species rendered extinct.

Unfortunately for the Megaverse, however, the Old Ones could not be destroyed: it was feared that the destruction of entities that powerful would cause a chain reaction (roughly analogous to a nuclear one, but mystical in nature) and an "explosion" that would destroy all universes. Instead, they were put into an eternal mystic slumber and hidden away between dimensions beyond the reach of all but the most powerful gods and (good) Alien Intelligences. Constant vigilance and effort is required to keep these beings asleep, and various members of the Great Powers of the Palladium Megaverse cooperate with one another to ensure that they never again awaken.

The leader of the Old Ones is/was a Great Old One once called Xy who, through a series of circumstances and betrayal, forgot his own past and now believes himself to be Thoth, the ancient Egyptian god of Wisdom. It was he, as Thoth, who helped to fashion the super-spell that would finally force the Old Ones into mystic slumber.

Powers and abilities
The Old Ones possess the standard range of powers common to nearly all Alien Intelligences, only on a scale orders of magnitude more powerful than the "average" Alien Intelligence. These beings are each said to have millions of points of Mega Damage Capacity Rifts (role-playing game)#Damage and firepower, powerful enough to inflict many thousands of Mega Damage points per attack, and are believed to be capable of destroying entire dimensions unaided.

The Old Ones are mystically confined and kept asleep in an intradimensional void inaccessible to all in the Megaverse except a very tiny handful of ultra-powerful beings, and are effectively indestructible).

Potential threats to the entire Palladium Megaverse such as Nxla, the Four Horsemen, the Lord of the Deep, Tikilik, and the Dweller Below, were considered "minor" threats relative to the Old Ones despite their own vast powers, and were therefore spared the fate of eternal slumber placed on the Old Ones by the Forces of Light. Nxla's status is questionable, however, as some believe him to be an Old One who tricked his way out of punishment, and others believe this to be lies spread by Nxla to create fear.

The Old Ones were sufficiently powerful enough to keep legions of lesser Alien Intelligences, Gods, and even dragons -usually solitary, vastly powerful creatures in their own right that call no one master -as servants and slaves.

Xy has been given stats twice (Rifts World Book 4: Africa and Palladium Fantasy: Dragons and Gods) however this is only at a fraction of his former power as Thoth. Xy's stats at full power have never been printed by Palladium.

The other 7 Greatest Old Ones originally had their stats printed on the final (210th) page of Old Ones 1st Edition. These stats were removed in the 2nd Edition version of the book, and the GOOs were not included in Dragons and Gods, so their abilities (much like the beings in the Ultimax Deathstone) have not been increased to 2nd Edition levels like the rest of the first edition Gods, Dragon Gods, Demon Lords and Devil Lords.

Lessers
Some other beings are referred to as being possible "lesser" (rather than "greater") Old Ones, including Vampire Intelligences (in Rifts World Book 1: Vampire Kingdoms and Nightbane World Book 4: Shadows of Light), Nxla (in Rifts World Book 12; Psyscape), and Slyth (in Old Ones 2nd Edition).

References

Palladium Fantasy series:
Palladium Fantasy RPG
The Old Ones
Dragons & Gods
Rifts:
Conversion Book 2: Pantheons of the Megaverse
World Book 12: Psyscape

Sources

Fictional extraterrestrial characters
Megaverse (Palladium Books)